Isognomon californicus, the black purse shell or nahawele, is a species of Hawaiian bivalve in the family Isognomonidae. It was first formally named in 1837 by Timothy Abbott Conrad as Perla californica.

References

Pteriida
Bivalves described in 1837